Ricardo Arias may refer to:

Ricardo Arias (politician) (1912–1993), former Panamanian President
Ricardo Arias Calderón (1933–1997), Panamanian politician
Ricardo Alberto Arias (born 1940), Panamanian ambassador
Ricardo Arias (footballer) (born 1957), Spanish former footballer